ABC-9 is the callsign for the ABC television station in Canberra, Australian Capital Territory.

ABC 9 may also refer to one of the following television stations in the United States:

Current affiliates
KCAU-TV in Sioux City, Iowa
KCRG-TV in Cedar Rapids, Iowa
KECY-DT2 in El Centro, California / Yuma, Arizona
KEZI in Eugene, Oregon
KGUN-TV in Tucson, Arizona
KMBC-TV in Kansas City, Missouri
KTRE in Lufkin, Texas
Semi-satellite of KLTV in Tyler, Texas
WAOW in Wausau, Wisconsin
WCPO-TV in Cincinnati, Ohio
WFTV in Orlando, Florida
WMUR-TV in Manchester, New Hampshire
WSOC-TV in Charlotte, North Carolina
WSYR-TV in Syracuse, New York
WTVA-DT2 in Tupelo, Mississippi
WTVC in Chattanooga, Tennessee

Formerly affiliated
KABY-TV in Aberdeen, South Dakota (1983 to 2017)
KMSP-TV in Minneapolis / Saint Paul, Minnesota (1961 to 1979)
KUSA in Denver, Colorado (1953 to 1995)
KVKM-TV/KMOM-TV in Odessa / Midland, Texas (1958 to 1981)